The New Mexico State Register of Cultural Properties is a register of historic and prehistoric properties located in the state of New Mexico. It is maintained by the New Mexico Historic Preservation Division of the New Mexico Department of Cultural Affairs. The Cultural Properties Review Committee meets at least six times a year. The committee lists properties in the State Register and forwards nominations to the National Register.

Current listings 

Properties listed on the New Mexico State Register of Cultural Properties:

 Abo Mission Ruin NR & NHL
 Davey, Randall, House
 Pictured Cliffs Archeological Site
 San Miguel, Church of
 Hubbell House
 Ojo Caliente Mineral Springs Barn
 Route 66 & Nat'l Old Trails Rd Hist Dist at La Bajada
 Fort McRae (LA 4983)
 Carrie Tingley Hospital Historic District
 Thomas Branigan Memorial Library
 Couse, Eanger Irving, House and Studio and Sharp, Joseph Henry, Studios
 Ozark Trails Marker at Lake Arthur
 St. Joseph Apache Mission Church
 New Mexico Madonna of the Trail
 Arroyo Hondo Pueblo
 Agua Fria Schoolhouse Site (LA 2)
 El Camino Real de Tierra Adentro, N Arroyo Alamillo Sect
 Oliver Lee Dog Canyon Ranch
 Raton Pass Scenic Highway
 Gallup Commercial Historic District
 Zimmerman Library
 Paul Laurence Dunbar Elementary School
 Tortugas Pueblo Fiesta of Our Lady of Guadalupe
 Roswell Artist-in-Residence Compound
 Lincoln Jackson School
 Casa del Gavilan
 El Camino Real de Tierra Adentro-La Bajada North Section
 El Camino Real de Tierra Adentro--La Bajdad South Section
 St. John's Cathedral
 Main Library, Albuquerque
 John Gaw Meem Architects Office
 Georgia O'Keeffe Ghost Ranch House
 Burnt Corn Archaeological District
 Hyde Memorial State Park
 El Rancho de las Golondrinas

Former listings

See also
List of National Historic Landmarks in New Mexico
National Register of Historic Places listings in New Mexico

References

External links

 
 
History of New Mexico
New Mexico
New Mexico culture